Ádám Madarassy (born March 14, 1985, in Budapest) is a Hungarian swimmer who specialized in butterfly events. Madarassy was a member of the swimming team for the Louisville Cardinals and also a management graduate at the University of Louisville in Louisville, Kentucky.

Madarassy competed for Hungary in the men's 100 m butterfly at the 2008 Summer Olympics in Beijing. Leading up to the Games, he registered a time of 54.28 to eclipse the FINA B-cut (54.70) by 0.42 of a second at the USA Swimming Grand Prix in Columbus, Ohio. Madarassy threw down his lifetime best of 53.93 to hit the wall with a fourth-place finish in heat three, trailing winner Rimvydas Šalčius of Lithuania by just more than a second. Madarassy failed to advance into the semifinals, as he placed fiftieth out of 66 swimmers in the prelims.

References

External links
 Player Bio – Louisville Cardinals
 NBC 2008 Olympics profile
 
 
 

1985 births
Living people
Hungarian male swimmers
Olympic swimmers of Hungary
Swimmers at the 2008 Summer Olympics
Male butterfly swimmers
Swimmers from Budapest
Louisville Cardinals men's swimmers